The federalization of Syria has been controversially proposed as a possible solution to end the Syrian Civil War. In the broadest sense, it means turning the centralized Syrian Arab Republic into a federal republic with autonomous subdivisions. Many powers and actors involved in the Syrian Civil War have entertained the idea of "federal division", not least among them Russia, United Nations representatives, and the United States. President Bashar al-Assad has not ruled out the possibility of a federal democratic state of Syria. Turkey is strongly hostile towards the idea of federalization in Syria because it fears possible repercussions for its own highly centralized state.

Due to the fact that federalization would more or less follow ethnic and possibly also religious-sectarian lines, it has been dismissed as "division of the country" and "Balkanization" by its opponents. Mainstream institutions of the Syrian opposition based in Turkey or Qatar like the Syrian National Council and the National Coalition for Syrian Revolutionary and Opposition Forces have consistently rejected the idea of federalization, while Kurds in Syria have strongly promoted the idea. The Egypt-based opposition party Syria's Tomorrow Movement takes an intermediate position.

Timeline during the Syrian Civil War
On 17 March 2016, the Autonomous Administration of North and East Syria was unilaterally declared a federation of autonomous cantons modelled after the cantons of Switzerland; Afrin Canton, Jazira Canton and Kobanî Canton, as well as the Shahba region. The federation is considered by its protagonists to be a model for Syria as a whole. The move was dismissed by the Syrian government and disapproved of by Turkey and the United States.

In September 2016, the Secretary-General of the Arab League, Ahmed Aboul Gheit, came out in an interview as one of the first regional politicians taking a public stand for the federalization of Syria. He said that the establishment of a federal system in Syria would "guarantee to preserve the institutions and unity" and that a federal system would be "the most appropriate solution and will protect the country from destruction."

In October 2016, a Russian initiative for federalization with a focus on northern Syria was reported, which at its core called for the existing institutions of the Autonomous Administration of North and East Syria to be recognised by the Syrian government, which rejected the call.

After multilateral peace talks in Astana in January 2017, Russia offered a draft for a future constitution of Syria, which would inter alia turn the "Syrian Arab Republic" into the "Republic of Syria", introduce decentralized authorities as well as elements of federalism like "association areas", strengthen the parliament at the cost of the presidency, and realize secularism by abolishing Islamic jurisprudence as a source of legislation. The same month, United Kingdom Foreign Secretary Boris Johnson said that "implementation of a Dayton style accord in Syria and introduction of some form of a federal solution in Syria (...) may indeed be the right way forward or the only way forward in the end of all this."

Historical antecedents

During the French mandate, Syria was subdivided into various autonomous entities, most of which bore the designation "state" (in French État; in Arabic Dawlat):
the State of the Alawites
the Province of Jazira
the Jabal Druze State (originally called the State of Souaida)
the State of Aleppo
the State of Damascus
the State of Greater Lebanon
the State of Hatay (originally called the Sanjak of Alexandretta)
the State of Syria

These autonomous entities did not correspond to the administrative division of Ottoman Syria. France ceded Hatay to Turkey in 1939, and Lebanon became an independent state (separate from the rest of Syria) in 1945.

See also

Constitution of Syria
Autonomous Administration of North and East Syria
Ethnic groups in Syria
Regions of Rojava
Religion in Syria
Sectarianism and minorities in the Syrian Civil War
Syrian Democratic Forces
Syrian peace process

References

External links

Syria
Federalism in Syria
Syria
Politics of the Autonomous Administration of North and East Syria
Politics of Syria
Subdivisions of Syria
Syrian civil war
Syrian peace process